Katerina Veronika Anna Dusíková (8 March 1769 – 24 March 1833) was a Bohemian singer, harpist, pianist and composer. She was also known as Veronika Rosalia Dusik (Dussek), Veronika Elisabeta Dusíková and Veronica Cianchettini. She was born in Čáslav, Bohemia, and began her studies in music with her organist father Jan Josef Dusik. She later moved to London to stay with her brother, composer Jan Ladislav Dusik, and married music publisher Francesco Cianchettini. She died in London in 1833.

Works
Dusiková composed works including two piano concertos and a number of solo piano works. Selected compositions include:
Sonata, op. 8 for piano
Variations on a Roman Air for piano
''Sonates (Klav.) (C, B, e) (lost during wartime)

References

External links
 

1769 births
1833 deaths
18th-century classical composers
19th-century classical composers
Czech classical composers
Czech music educators
Women classical composers
Women music educators
19th-century women composers
18th-century women composers